P. dokdonensis may refer to:

Phycicoccus dokdonensis, a Gram-positive bacterium.
Porphyrobacter dokdonensis, a Gram-negative bacterium.
Polaribacter dokdonensis, a Gram-negative bacterium of the genus Polaribacter.
Pseudoxanthomonas dokdonensis, a Gram-negative bacterium of the genus Pseudoxanthomonas.